is a Japanese shōjo manga artist best known for writing science fiction manga. She debuted in 1979 with Megumi-chan ni Sasageru Comedy in LaLa. She won the 1993 Seiun Award for best science fiction manga for Oz and the 1997 Kodansha Manga Award for shōjo manga for Eight Clouds Rising. Several of her works have been adapted as anime, including Jyu Oh Sei, Oz, Eight Clouds Rising, and Hanasakeru Seishōnen. Her series Demon Sacred and Jyu Oh Sei are licensed in North America by Tokyopop, and the anime of Jyu Oh Sei is distributed in English by Funimation.

Works
Story & Art (manga)
Vampir
Demon Sacred
Hanasakeru Seishōnen
Jyu-Oh-Sei
OZ
Eight Clouds Rising
Marcello Storia
Passion Parade
Tokiiro Triangle
Eccentric City
Original story (OAV, anime television series)
OVA
Yakumo Tatsu
OZ
Anime television series
Jyu Oh Sei
Hanasakeru Seishōnen

References

External links 
  
 Hakusensha's Comicate Interview with Natsumi Itsuki 
 
 Profile  at The Ultimate Manga Page

 
1960 births
Women manga artists
Manga artists from Hyōgo Prefecture
Winner of Kodansha Manga Award (Shōjo)
Japanese female comics artists
Female comics writers
Living people
21st-century Japanese writers
21st-century Japanese women writers